Lakhan Kalan  is a village in Kapurthala district of Punjab State, India. Kalan is Persian language word which means Big. The village is administrated by a Sarpanch, who is the elected representative of the area as per the constitution of India and Panchayati raj (India).

Demography 
According to the report published by Census India in 2011, Lakhan Kalan has total number of 667 houses and population of 3,593 of which include 1,852 males and 1,741 females. Literacy rate of Lakhan Kalan is 72.41%, lower than state average of 75.84%.  The population of children under the age of 6 years is 393 which is 10.94% of total population of Lakhan Kalan, and child sex ratio is approximately 889, higher than state average of 846.

Population data

Air travel connectivity 
The closest airport to the village is Sri Guru Ram Dass Jee International Airport.

Villages in Kapurthala

References

External links
  Villages in Kapurthala
 Kapurthala Villages List

Villages in Kapurthala district